António Joaquim Magalhães Cabral (30 April 1931 – 23 October 2007) was a Portuguese poet, fictionist, playwright, ethnographer and essayist.

Bibliography

Poetry 
1951 - Sonhos do meu Anjo
1956 - O Mar e as Águias
1958 - Falo-vos da Montanha
1960 - A Flor e as Palavras (1º Prémio de Manuscritos do SNI)
1963 - Poemas Durienses
1967 - Os Homens Cantam a Nordeste
1971 - Quando o Silêncio Reverdece
1976 - A Hierarquia dos Na(ba)bos
1977 - Emigração Clandestina
1979 - Aqui, Douro
1983 - Entre o Azul e a Circunstância
1993 - Novos Poemas Durienses
1996 - Festa de Natal e Reis: poesia, música, teatro
1997 - Bodas Selvagens
1999 - Antologia dos Poemas Durienses
2000 - O Peso da Luz nas Coisas
2003 - Ouve-se um Rumor e Entre Quem É
2003 - Contos de Natal para Crianças
2007 - O Rio Que Perdeu as Margens
2007 - A Tentação de Santo Antão (posthumous publication)

Fiction
1983 - Festa em Setembro; Jogos Populares em Sabrosa; Pedro e Isabel
1990 - Memória Delta
1995 - A Noiva de Caná
2005 - O Prometeu Agrilhoado Hoje

Theatre
1975 - O Herói (2nd prize of Academia Teresopolitana de Letras, Teresópolis, Brasil, in 1964)
1977 - A Linha e o Nó
1977 - 7 Peças em um Acto
1994 - Semires
2005 - A Fraga das Dunas
2008 - A Moura Encantada

Ethnography
1980 - Jogos Populares Transmontanos
1983 - 14 Jogos Populares
1985 - Cancioneiro Popular Duriense
1986 - Jogos Populares Portugueses
1988 - Os Jogos Populares: Onze Anos de História: 1977-1988
1990 - Teatro Popular: a Criação do Mundo ou o Ramo
1991 - Jogos Populares Infantis
1993 - Adeus, Adeus, ó Castedo
1998 - Jogos Populares Portugueses de Jovens e Adultos
1991 - Jogos Populares e Provérbios da Vinha e do Vinho
2001 - A Cantiga e o Romance Popular no Alto Douro

Ludic Theory
1981 - Os Jogos Populares e o Ensino
1984 - A Perspetiva Cultural dos Jogos Populares
1990 - Teoria do Jogo
1992 - A Imitação e a Competição no Jogo Infantil
1994 - O Modelo Lúdico do Ensino-Aprendizagem
1999 - Tradições Populares – I
1999 - Tradições Populares – II
2001 - O Jogo no Ensino
2002 - O Mundo Fascinante do Jogo

Essay

Literature
1965 - História da Literatura Portuguesa
1971 - Morfologia Literária
1977 - Miguel Torga, o Orfeu Rebelde

Sources 
 Life and work of António Cabral (1931-2007) 
Projecto Vercial - António Cabral 

1931 births
2007 deaths
19th-century Portuguese poets
Portuguese novelists
Portuguese ethnographers
20th-century Portuguese poets
Portuguese male poets
19th-century male writers
20th-century male writers